Yasufumi Yamamoto (born 3 May 1971) is a former professional tennis player from Japan.

Biography
Yamamoto, who comes from Shizuoka, played on the professional tour in the 1990s and featured in seven Davis Cup ties for Japan. Most of his ATP Tour main draw appearances were in his home country, including the Japan Open where he competed in singles on six occasions. He represented Japan at the Hopman Cup in both 1992 and 1993. At the 1994 Asian Games he was a member of the bronze medal winning Japanese men's team.

See also
List of Japan Davis Cup team representatives

References

External links
 
 
 

1971 births
Living people
Japanese male tennis players
Sportspeople from Shizuoka Prefecture
Tennis players at the 1994 Asian Games
Asian Games bronze medalists for Japan
Asian Games medalists in tennis
Hopman Cup competitors
Medalists at the 1994 Asian Games
20th-century Japanese people